The following is a list of rapid transit systems in Pakistan:

Bus rapid transit

Rail rapid transit

See also 
 List of bus rapid transit systems
 List of rapid transit systems
 Transport in Pakistan

Notes

References 

Rapid transit in Pakistan